is a railway station in the city of Kiyosu, Aichi Prefecture,  Japan, operated by Meitetsu.

Lines

Station layout
The station has two unnumbered island platforms connected by a level crossing. The station has automated ticket machines, Manaca automated turnstiles and is unattended.

Platforms

Junctions

, where the northbound Inuyama line diverges from the northbound Main Line
, where the southbound lines diverge

Adjacent stations

Station history
Nishi Biwajima Station was opened on January 23, 1914. The station was closed in 1944 due to World War II, and was reopened on August 1, 1944.

Passenger statistics
In fiscal 2013, the station was used by an average of 830 passengers daily.

Surrounding area
 Nishi Biwajima Elementary School

See also
 List of Railway Stations in Japan

References

External links

 Official web page 

Railway stations in Japan opened in 1914
Railway stations in Aichi Prefecture
Stations of Nagoya Railroad
Kiyosu, Aichi